Cherokee Central Schools (Cherokee: ᏣᎳᎩ ᏧᎾᏕᎶᏆᏍᏗ ᏚᏓᏥᏍᎬᎢ tsalagi tsunadeloquasdi dudatsisgvi) is a school district in Cherokee, North Carolina, consisting of a single campus holding buildings serving grades K-12 and the administration office. The schools are a K-5 elementary school, a 6-8 middle school, and a 9-12 high school (Cherokee High School). The Ravensford Campus, the academic campus, occupies much of the historic Ravensford archaeological site. In 1987–88, the elementary school was recognized as a Blue Ribbon School.

It geographically covers the Eastern Cherokee Reservation, both in Swain County and in Jackson County.

Its campuses operate under association with the Bureau of Indian Education (BIE).

Operations
The district has its own school board. By 1996 the school board contracted with the Cherokee Boys' Club, which operated the school district's finances, cafeterias, and school buses..

References

External links

 Cherokee Central School

School districts in North Carolina
Education in Jackson County, North Carolina
Education in Swain County, North Carolina
Eastern Band of Cherokee Indians
Native American education